Banfe is a town subdivision of Bad Laasphe in the Siegen-Wittgenstein district in North Rhine-Westphalia, Germany, with 1500 inhabitants.

Geography 
Hesselbach lies in southern Wittgenstein, 3 km in the south-west of Bad Laasphe.

References

External links

Villages in North Rhine-Westphalia